Beihan may refer to:

Yemen
Beihan, also known as Beihan al-Qasab, the capital of Bayhan District
Bayhan District, also known as Beihan District, a district of Shabwah Governorate
Emirate of Beihan, a former state located in modern Bayhan District

China
Northern Han (951–979), a dynasty in North China during the Five Dynasties period
Beihan Township, Hebei (北汉乡), a township in Renqiu, Hebei
Beihan Township, Shanxi (北韩乡), a township in Fushan County, Shanxi

Korea
North Korea (北韩), formally the Democratic People's Republic of Korea

See also
MV Beihan, an Empire ship that was renamed to Beihan in 1955